The 2018 Stanley Cup playoffs was the playoff tournament of the National Hockey League (NHL). The playoffs began on April 11, 2018, after the 2017–18 regular season and concluded on June 7, 2018, with the Washington Capitals winning their first Stanley Cup in franchise history defeating the Vegas Golden Knights four games to one in the Stanley Cup Finals.

The Nashville Predators made the playoffs as the Presidents' Trophy winners with the most points (i.e. best record) during the regular season. The Pittsburgh Penguins increased their post-season appearance streak to twelve seasons, the current longest streak.

The Vegas Golden Knights became the first team to make the playoffs in their inaugural season in the league since the 1979–80 Hartford Whalers and the Edmonton Oilers. They also became the first expansion team to make the playoffs in their inaugural season since the 1967 NHL expansion. From there, they eventually became the first team since the 1967–68 St. Louis Blues to win their respective conference, and reach the Stanley Cup Finals in their inaugural season. The only difference is that the 1967–68 season through to the 1969–70 season ensured that an expansion team would be able to reach the Stanley Cup Finals. For the fourth time in league history (2000, 2001, 2007), only two Original Six teams, the Boston Bruins and Toronto Maple Leafs, clinched a berth for the playoffs. For the first time since 1966, no playoff games were played in the state of New York.
For the fifth time in eight years, all three California-based teams made the playoffs. For the first time in league history, the Montreal Canadiens and the Detroit Red Wings missed the playoffs in the same year. For the first time since 1969, both the Chicago Blackhawks and the Detroit Red Wings missed the playoffs in the same season. For the first time since 2009, no California-based team reached the Conference Finals. For the first and only time since 2012, the New Jersey Devils made the playoffs.

The playoffs featured ten overtime games, the fewest since 2000. This was also the first time since 1997 that no games played in either the Conference Finals or Stanley Cup Finals went to overtime.

Playoff seeds

This was the fifth year in which the top three teams in each division made the playoffs, along with two wild cards in each conference (for a total of eight playoff teams from each conference).

The following teams qualified for the playoffs:

Eastern Conference

Atlantic Division
 Tampa Bay Lightning, Atlantic Division champions, Eastern Conference regular season champions – 113 points
 Boston Bruins – 112 points
 Toronto Maple Leafs – 105 points

Metropolitan Division
 Washington Capitals, Metropolitan Division champions – 105 points
 Pittsburgh Penguins – 100 points
 Philadelphia Flyers – 98 points

Wild cards
 Columbus Blue Jackets – 97 points (39 , 6 points head-to-head vs. New Jersey)
 New Jersey Devils – 97 points (39 , 2 points head-to-head vs. Columbus)

Western Conference

Central Division
 Nashville Predators, Central Division champions, Western Conference regular season champions, Presidents' Trophy winners – 117 points
 Winnipeg Jets – 114 points
 Minnesota Wild – 101 points

Pacific Division
 Vegas Golden Knights, Pacific Division champions – 109 points
 Anaheim Ducks – 101 points
 San Jose Sharks – 100 points

Wild cards
 Los Angeles Kings – 98 points
 Colorado Avalanche – 95 points

Playoff bracket
In each round, teams competed in a best-of-seven series following a 2–2–1–1–1 format (scores in the bracket indicate the number of games won in each best-of-seven series). The team with home ice advantage played at home for games one and two (and games five and seven, if necessary), and the other team was at home for games three and four (and game six, if necessary). The top three teams in each division made the playoffs, along with two wild cards in each conference, for a total of eight teams from each conference. 

In the First Round, the lower seeded wild card in the conference played against the division winner with the best record while the other wild card played against the other division winner, and both wild cards were de facto #4 seeds. The other series matched the second and third place teams from the divisions. In the first two rounds, home ice advantage was awarded to the team with the better seed. Thereafter, it was awarded to the team that had the better regular season record.

Legend
 A1, A2, A3 – The first, second, and third place teams from the Atlantic Division, respectively
 M1, M2, M3 – The first, second, and third place teams from the Metropolitan Division, respectively
 C1, C2, C3 – The first, second, and third place teams from the Central Division, respectively
 P1, P2, P3 – The first, second, and third place teams from the Pacific Division, respectively
 WC – Wild Card teams

First Round

Eastern Conference First Round

(A1) Tampa Bay Lightning vs. (WC2) New Jersey Devils
The Tampa Bay Lightning finished first in the Atlantic Division earning 113 points. New Jersey finished as the Eastern Conference's second wild card, earning 97 points. This was the third playoff meeting between these teams with New Jersey winning both previous series. They last met in the 2007 Eastern Conference Quarterfinals, which New Jersey won in six games. New Jersey won all three games in this year's regular season series.

The Lightning defeated the Devils in five games. Although Taylor Hall scored his first playoff goal in game one, the Devils were beaten 5–2 as Ondrej Palat recorded three points for Tampa Bay. In game two, a four-goal barrage by the Lightning during the second period forced Devils goaltender Keith Kinkaid to be pulled. Tampa won the game 5–3. The Devils recovered in game three as Taylor Hall scored a goal and two assists in a 5–2 victory. J. T. Miller and Nikita Kucherov both had three points in a 3–1 victory for the Lightning in game four. In game five, Kucherov's goal was the series-winner as the Lightning held off a late attack by the Devils to win 3–1.

(A2) Boston Bruins vs. (A3) Toronto Maple Leafs
The Boston Bruins finished second in the Atlantic Division earning 112 points. The Toronto Maple Leafs earned 105 points to finish third in the Atlantic Division. This was the fifteenth playoff meeting between these two teams with Toronto winning eight of the fourteen previous series. They last met in the 2013 Eastern Conference Quarterfinals, which Boston won in seven games. Toronto won three of the four games in this year's regular season series.

The Bruins defeated the Maple Leafs in seven games. Tuukka Rask made 26 saves for the Bruins in game one, winning the game 5–1. During the game, Maple Leafs forward Nazem Kadri was given a five-minute major for a charging penalty for his hit on Tommy Wingels; he would later be suspended for three games. David Pastrnak had a hat trick and three assists in a 7–3 victory for the Bruins in game two, becoming the first player since Claude Giroux in 2012 to score a hat trick and three assists. In game three, Patrick Marleau scored twice for the Maple Leafs in a 4–2 victory. Pastrnak assisted twice on two goals in a 3–1 triumph for the Bruins, taking a 3–1 series lead in the process. In game five, Toronto prevented a come-back by Boston, fending off the Bruins 4–3 as Frederik Andersen made 42 saves for the Maple Leafs. Nikita Zaitsev assisted twice in a 3–1 Maple Leafs victory, forcing a seventh game in the series. In game seven, Bruins forward Patrice Bergeron scored a goal and recorded two assists in a 7–4 victory to advance his team to the second round.

(M1) Washington Capitals vs. (WC1) Columbus Blue Jackets
The Washington Capitals finished first in the Metropolitan Division earning 105 points. The Columbus Blue Jackets finished as the Eastern Conference's first wild card earning 97 points. This was the first playoff meeting between these two teams. Washington won three of the four games in this year's regular season series.

The Capitals came back from a 2–0 series deficit to defeat the Blue Jackets in six games. Columbus came back from a two-goal deficit in game one to force overtime, during which Artemi Panarin scored 6:02 into the extra session to give the Blue Jackets their first lead in a playoff series. The Blue Jackets overcame another two-goal deficit in game two, taking the game into overtime yet again. Matt Calvert scored the game-winning goal for Columbus as they took a 2–0 series lead. The Capitals took game three 3–2 in double-overtime as Lars Eller scored the game winner. The Capitals tied the series after game four as Washington's Alexander Ovechkin had a goal and an assist in a 4–1 victory. Nicklas Backstrom's tip-in was the overtime-winner for the Capitals in game five as they prevented a two-goal comeback by the Blue Jackets. In game six, Capitals captain Alexander Ovechkin scored twice to seal the series for Washington, winning the affair 6–3. With playoff series victories by Winnipeg and Vegas this season, Columbus became the last active NHL franchise without a playoff series win until they defeated the Tampa Bay Lightning in 2019.

(M2) Pittsburgh Penguins vs. (M3) Philadelphia Flyers
The Pittsburgh Penguins finished second in the Metropolitan Division earning 100 points. The Philadelphia Flyers earned 98 points to finish third in the Metropolitan. This was the seventh playoff meeting between these two rivals with Philadelphia winning four of the six previous series. They last met in the 2012 Eastern Conference Quarterfinals, which Philadelphia won in six games. Pittsburgh won all four games in this year's regular season series.

The Penguins defeated the Flyers in six games. In game one, Sidney Crosby capped off a hat trick to end a 7–0 rout over the Flyers. The Flyers defeated the Penguins in game two, riding on Sean Couturier's goal and two assists in a 5–1 victory. Pittsburgh took game three 5–1 as Crosby recorded a goal and three assists. Matt Murray recorded a shutout in game four stopping all 26 shots he faced in a 5–0 victory for Pittsburgh. Prior to game five, Flyers captain Claude Giroux guaranteed his team a victory. Giroux scored the first goal of the game, and Couturier scored game-winning goal with 1:15 left in regulation time to force a sixth game in a 4–2 victory for Philadelphia. In game six, Sean Couturier recorded a hat trick on a torn MCL. Jake Guentzel recorded a natural hat trick and scored four goals in total, including two within ten seconds of each other, to seal the series for the Penguins in an 8–5 victory.

Western Conference First Round

(C1) Nashville Predators vs. (WC2) Colorado Avalanche
The Nashville Predators earned the Presidents' Trophy as the NHL's best regular season team with 117 points. The Colorado Avalanche finished as the Western Conference's second wild card earning 95 points. This was the first playoff meeting between these two teams. Nashville won all four games in this year's regular season series.

The Predators defeated the Avalanche in six games. Filip Forsberg scored twice in Nashville's 5–2 game one victory, one of which was considered a highlight-reel goal. Nashville had five different players score in their 5–4 victory over Colorado in game two to take a 2–0 series lead. Nathan MacKinnon scored twice and Gabriel Landeskog had a goal and two assists to take game three for the Avalanche 5–3. In game four, Pekka Rinne made 31 saves for the Predators who took a 3–1 series lead with a 3–2 win. Andrew Hammond made 44 saves and Sven Andrighetto scored with 1:28 left in the third period to force a sixth game for the Avalanche in a 2–1 triumph. The Predators shut out the Avalanche in game six, with Rinne stopping all 22 shots he faced in a 5–0 victory.

(C2) Winnipeg Jets vs. (C3) Minnesota Wild
The Winnipeg Jets finished second in the Central Division earning 114 points. The Minnesota Wild earned 101 points to finish third in the Central. This was the first playoff meeting between these two teams. Winnipeg won three of the four games in this year's regular season series.

The Jets defeated the Wild in five games and earned their first playoff series victory in franchise history after entering the league in 1999 as the Atlanta Thrashers. The Jets also became the first Winnipeg-based NHL team to advance past the opening round of the playoffs since 1987. After firing 40 shots on Minnesota goaltender Devan Dubnyk, the Jets won game one 3–2, winning their first playoff game in franchise history and the city's first playoff victory since 1996, after which the original Jets relocated to Phoenix. In game two, Patrik Laine had a goal and an assist to provide the Jets a 4–1 victory as well as a 2–0 series lead. In game three, the Wild scored four goals in the second period to chase Jets goaltender Connor Hellebuyck in a 6–2 affair. Hellebuyck came back in game four, stopping all 30 shots he faced in a 2–0 victory. Hellebuyck continued his shutout streak in game five, stopping another 30 shots after a first period blitz by the Jets to win the series-clinching game 5–0.

(P1) Vegas Golden Knights vs. (WC1) Los Angeles Kings

The Vegas Golden Knights finished first in the Pacific Division earning 109 points. The Los Angeles Kings earned 98 points to finish as the Western Conference's first wild card. This was the first playoff meeting between these two teams and the first playoff series for the Golden Knights. These teams split their four-game regular season series.

The Golden Knights defeated the Kings in a four-game sweep. In game one, Marc-Andre Fleury stopped all 30 shots to give the Golden Knights their first playoff victory. Even though Kings goaltender Jonathan Quick made 54 saves in game two, the Golden Knights topped Los Angeles in double overtime thanks to Erik Haula's goal at 15:23, taking a 2–0 series lead. After the Golden Knights took the lead late in the third period of game three with two goals in 21 seconds Vegas pushed the Kings to the brink of elimination with a 3–2 win; Vegas goaltender Marc-Andre Fleury made 37 saves in the victory. In game four, former-King Brayden McNabb scored the only goal of the game for the Golden Knights as they swept Los Angeles for their first playoff series victory. This series tied the record for the fewest goals scored by both teams in a best-of-seven playoff series: the Golden Knights scored seven goals to the Kings' three goals for a total of ten goals, tying the record set in 2003. In addition, the 7 goals scored by Vegas is the lowest amount by a series-winning team in NHL history.

(P2) Anaheim Ducks vs. (P3) San Jose Sharks

The Anaheim Ducks finished second in the Pacific Division earning 101 points. The San Jose Sharks earned 100 points to finish third in the Pacific Division. This was the second playoff meeting between these teams. They last met in the 2009 Western Conference Quarterfinals, which Anaheim won in six games. San Jose won three of the four games in this year's regular season series.

The Sharks defeated the Ducks in a four-game sweep. Evander Kane scored twice in his first playoff game and Sharks goaltender Martin Jones posted a 25-save shutout blanking the Ducks 3–0 in game one. In game two, Logan Couture scored a goal and recorded an assist in a 3–2 victory. Martin Jones made 45 saves as the Sharks routed the Ducks 8–1 in game three; eight different players scored for San Jose in the victory. Tomas Hertl broke the tie for San Jose, scoring the series-clinching goal midway through the third period of game four as the Sharks defeated Anaheim 2–1.

Second Round

Eastern Conference Second Round

(A1) Tampa Bay Lightning vs. (A2) Boston Bruins
This was the second playoff meeting between these two teams. Their only previous series occurred in the 2011 Eastern Conference Final, which Boston won in seven games. Boston won three of the four games in this year's regular season series.

The Lightning defeated the Bruins in five games. In game one, the line of Brad Marchand, Patrice Bergeron, and David Pastrnak combined for eleven points in a 6–2 triumph. Brayden Point scored a goal and recorded three assists in the Lightning's 4–2 victory in game two, evening the series. Ondrej Palat scored twice in the Lightning's 4–1 win in game three taking a 2–1 series lead. Tampa Bay captain Steven Stamkos forced overtime on a controversial goal. While circling behind the net Bruin defender Charlie McAvoy was hauled down by Nikita Kucherov leading to a turnover deep in the Bruins defensive zone. Daniel Girardi scored the game-winning goal to give the Lightning a 4–3 victory. During game four, Brad Marchand licked the face of Tampa Bay forward Ryan Callahan during a scrum. Marchand received no penalty or further punishment from the League. The Lightning scored twice in the second period of game five to take the lead and Anton Stralman scored an empty-net goal to give Tampa Bay a 3–1 victory and a 4–1 series win.

(M1) Washington Capitals vs. (M2) Pittsburgh Penguins
This was the third consecutive year that these two rivals have met in the second round and was the eleventh overall playoff meeting with Pittsburgh winning nine of the ten previous series. They last met in the previous year's Eastern Conference Second Round which Pittsburgh won in seven games. These teams split their four-game regular season series.

The Capitals defeated the Penguins in six games, defeating Pittsburgh for the second time in franchise history and the first time since 1994. Pittsburgh rallied from a two-goal deficit to take game one 3–2 leading on Jake Guentzel's goal and two assists. In game two, Braden Holtby made 32 saves for Washington, defeating the Penguins 4–1. Alexander Ovechkin scored with 1:07 left in the third period of game three to give the Capitals a 4–3 victory. During the game, Tom Wilson made an illegal check to the head of rookie Zach Aston-Reese who suffered a broken jaw along with a concussion. Wilson was suspended three games for his action. In game four, Guentzel scored twice for Pittsburgh in a 3–1 victory, evening the series 2–2. Both Evgeny Kuznetsov and Jakub Vrana had a goal and two assists for the Capitals in game five who took a 3–2 series lead after a 6–3 victory. In game six, the Capitals fired 30 shots and Evgeny Kuznetsov's goal in overtime ended the series in a 2–1 victory, moving Washington to the Conference Finals for the first time since 1998.

Western Conference Second Round

(C1) Nashville Predators vs. (C2) Winnipeg Jets
This was the first playoff meeting between these two teams. Nashville won three of the five games in this year's regular season series.

The Jets eliminated the Predators in seven games. Mark Scheifele scored twice and Jets goaltender Connor Hellebuyck made 47 saves in game one to defeat the Predators 4–1. In game two, Kevin Fiala scored 5:37 into overtime to give the Predators a 5–4 victory to even the series. The Jets overcame a three-goal deficit in game three with both Blake Wheeler and Dustin Byfuglien scoring twice in a 7–4 win. Pekka Rinne made 32 saves for the Predators in game four, allowing his team to win 2–1 and even the series 2–2. In game five, Kyle Connor scored twice and captain Blake Wheeler provided three assists in the Jets' 6–2 victory. The Predators forced a seventh game following game six in which both Viktor Arvidsson and Filip Forsberg scored twice and recorded an assist along with Pekka Rinne stopping all 34 shots in a 4–0 shutout. After recording a shutout the game prior, Pekka Rinne got pulled for the third time in the series after letting in the first two goals of game seven. His counterpart, Connor Hellebuyck, made 36 saves in the victory as the Jets won the game 5–1, advancing to the Conference Finals for the first time in franchise history.

(P1) Vegas Golden Knights vs. (P3) San Jose Sharks
This was the first playoff series between these two teams. Vegas won three of the four games in this year's regular season series.

The Golden Knights defeated the Sharks in six games. In game one, Marc-Andre Fleury stopped all 33 shots he faced and Vegas scored with seven different players to defeat San Jose 7–0. The Sharks used double-overtime to take game two 4–3 as Logan Couture's second goal of the game ended the Golden Knights' playoff winning streak. Game three also went into overtime, however, this time the Golden Knights' William Karlsson got the best of the Sharks, scoring the overtime-winner in a 4–3 victory for Vegas. Martin Jones shut out the Golden Knights in game four, stopping all 34 shots he faced, giving the Sharks a 4–0 victory to even the series 2–2. After the Golden Knights put up a 4–0 lead in game five, including two goals from rookie Alex Tuch, the Sharks scored three goals in the third period to come within one goal. However, Vegas halted the comeback when Jonathan Marchessault scored an empty-net goal to secure a 5–3 win. In game six, Marc-Andre Fleury recorded a 28-save shut out in a 3–0 victory to send the Golden Knights to their first Conference Finals.

Conference Finals

Eastern Conference Final

(A1) Tampa Bay Lightning vs. (M1) Washington Capitals

This was the third playoff meeting between these teams with Tampa Bay winning both previous series. They last met in the 2011 Eastern Conference Semifinals, which Tampa Bay won in a four-game sweep. Also since 2011, this was the first conference final between two division champions. This was the Lightning's fifth appearance in the Conference Finals, and their third in the last four seasons. Tampa Bay last went to the Conference Finals in 2016; they lost to the Pittsburgh Penguins in seven games. This was Washington's third Conference Finals appearance. They last made the Conference Finals in 1998; they defeated the Buffalo Sabres in six games. Tampa Bay won two of the three games in this year's regular season series.

The Capitals defeated the Lightning in seven games. In game one, Washington scored four consecutive goals across the first two periods forcing Tampa Bay coach Jon Cooper to pull goalie Andrei Vasilevskiy; the Capitals won 4–2. Lars Eller and Evgeny Kuznetsov had a goal and two assists in Washington's 6–2 triumph in game two. The Lightning struck back in game three as Victor Hedman potted a goal and two assists in Tampa's 4–2 victory. Andrei Vasilevskiy made 36 saves in game four as the Lightning won the game 4–2 and thus tied the series. In game five, Ryan Callahan had a goal and an assist for the Lightning as they hung on for 3–2 victory. In game six, Capitals goaltender Braden Holtby made 24 saves in a 3–0 shutout victory to force a seventh game. Braden Holtby stopped all 29 shots and Andre Burakovsky scored twice in game seven for Washington, advancing the Capitals to the Finals for the first time since 1998 in a 4–0 victory.

Western Conference Final

(C2) Winnipeg Jets vs. (P1) Vegas Golden Knights
This was the first playoff meeting between these two teams. This was the first time since 2003 where two teams were making their Conference Finals debut. The Jets advanced to the Conference Finals for the first time in their 19th year (seventh in Winnipeg) after entering the league in 1999 as the Atlanta Thrashers; they also became the first Winnipeg-based team in league history to make it past the second round. Vegas made the Conference Finals in their inaugural season becoming the first expansion team since the St. Louis Blues in 1968 to advance past the second round of the playoffs. Vegas won two of the three games in this year's regular season series.

The Golden Knights defeated the Jets in five games. In game one, Mark Scheifele scored a goal and recorded an assist in a 4–2 triumph over the Golden Knights. Jonathan Marchessault scored twice in Vegas' bounce-back win in game two, evening the series after a 3–1 victory. Marc-Andre Fleury made 33 saves for Vegas, including 15 in the third period of game three, to take a 4–2 victory. Fleury made an additional 35 saves in game four with Vegas forward Reilly Smith scoring the game-winning goal 13:02 into the third period. In game five, the Golden Knights held onto a 2–1 lead, after Ryan Reaves scored in the second period to break the tie, to win the game and became the first expansion team to move onto the Stanley Cup Finals since the St. Louis Blues in 1968.

Stanley Cup Finals

This was the first playoff meeting between these two teams. Vegas was making their Finals debut in their inaugural season, becoming the first team since the aforementioned St. Louis Blues to make the Finals in their first season. Washington made their second Finals appearance. Their only previous appearance in the Finals ended in a four-game sweep by the Detroit Red Wings in 1998. This was the first Finals since 2007 to feature two teams that had not previously won a Stanley Cup. Vegas won both games in this year's regular season series.

Player statistics

Skaters
These are the top ten skaters based on points.

Goaltenders
This is a combined table of the top five goaltenders based on goals against average and the top five goaltenders based on save percentage, with at least 420 minutes. The table is sorted by GAA, and the criteria for inclusion are bolded.

Television
This was the seventh postseason under NBC Sports' current 10-year contract for American television rights to the NHL. All national coverage of games was aired on either NBCSN, the NBC broadcast network, NHL Network, USA Network, or CNBC. Due to original programming commitments involving CNBC and USA Network, two first round games on April 18 were aired by Golf Channel. During the first round, excluding games exclusively broadcast on NBC, the regional rights holders of each participating U.S. team produced local telecasts of their respective games. For the second year, the first round national broadcasts were not blacked out on television in the markets of participating teams, and could co-exist with the local broadcasts (however, NBC-provided coverage was restricted in Pittsburgh and Las Vegas, where AT&T SportsNet holds the regional rights to the Penguins and the Golden Knights respectively).

In Canada, for the fourth postseason under Rogers Media's current 12-year contract, coverage was broadcast by Sportsnet and CBC under the Hockey Night in Canada brand, and streamed on Sportsnet Now, CBCSports.ca (for games televised by CBC), or the subscription service Rogers NHL Live. The Winnipeg Jets' first round series against the Minnesota Wild was assigned to Sportsnet, due to the Maple Leafs' series being prioritized to CBC, and to encourage subscription to the network since it is not carried on basic cable in Winnipeg.

In a surprise move, Sportsnet did not give any on-air assignments to Bob Cole during the playoffs—an exclusion that caught the veteran commentator off-guard. Instead, Sportsnet replaced Cole with Calgary Flames announcer Rick Ball, joining Jim Hughson, Paul Romanuk and Dave Randorf on play-by-play during the first two rounds of the playoffs. It was subsequently announced that Cole would retire from broadcasting the following season.

Fuelled by viewer interest in the Golden Knights' inaugural season and playoff run, and in Canada, the deep playoff run of the Winnipeg Jets, viewership of these playoffs saw noticeable increases. NBC reported that viewership of the conference finals collectively saw a 15% increase over 2017, with an average cross-platform viewership of 1.841 million (23% increase year-over-year) for the Western Conference finals featuring the Golden Knights, game one of said series (televised on NBC) seen by 2.374 viewers total, and game seven of the Lightning/Capitals Eastern Conference final pulling a 2.14 overnight rating—the highest viewership for a non-overtime game seven since 2015, and the highest cable viewership of the 2018 playoffs to-date. The Jets also contributed to strong viewership numbers in Canada, with Sportsnet reporting an average of 2.2 million across their second-round series.

References

External links
 2018 Stanley Cup playoffs

Stanley Cup playoffs
play